Toriana Patterson (born 2 February 1994) is an American-born Jamaican footballer who plays as a midfielder for Italian club Pink Bari and the Jamaica women's national team.

Career

Club
In 2018, Patterson signed for Italian Serie A side Pink Bari.

International
Patterson has represented Jamaica since 2014.

References

External links

1994 births
Living people
Citizens of Jamaica through descent
Jamaican women's footballers
Women's association football central defenders
Gintra Universitetas players
A.S.D. Pink Sport Time players
Serie A (women's football) players
Jamaica women's international footballers
2019 FIFA Women's World Cup players
Pan American Games competitors for Jamaica
Footballers at the 2019 Pan American Games
Jamaican expatriate women's footballers
Jamaican expatriate sportspeople in Lithuania
Expatriate women's footballers in Lithuania
Jamaican expatriate sportspeople in Italy
Expatriate women's footballers in Italy
People from Yorktown Heights, New York
Sportspeople from Westchester County, New York
Soccer players from New York (state)
American women's soccer players
Georgia Bulldogs women's soccer players
UConn Huskies women's soccer players
African-American women's soccer players
American sportspeople of Jamaican descent
American expatriate women's soccer players
American expatriate sportspeople in Lithuania
American expatriate sportspeople in Italy
21st-century African-American sportspeople
21st-century African-American women